Daniel Puder (born October 9, 1981) is an American retired professional wrestler and mixed martial artist.

As a mixed martial artist, Puder trained at the American Kickboxing Academy, in San Jose, California. He is undefeated in MMA competition, holding a record of eight wins and zero losses. As a professional wrestler, he trained at Ohio Valley Wrestling. He is best known for having won the WWE's $1,000,000 Tough Enough, the fourth Tough Enough competition. He has also worked for Ring of Honor and New Japan Pro Wrestling.

Early life
Puder was born on October 9, 1981 in the San Francisco Bay Area suburb of Cupertino, California and was raised by his parents, Brent and Wanda Puder.

Puder started amateur wrestling when he was 12 years old. In high school at Monta Vista High School, in Cupertino, California, he finished first place in his weight division in the California Interscholastic Federation (CIF) Central Coast Section, in amateur wrestling, while wrestling with a broken hand. At the age of 16, he began training in mixed martial arts and professional wrestling.

Professional wrestling career

World Wrestling Entertainment (2004–2005)

Tough Enough (2004–2005) 
Puder entered the fourth Tough Enough competition that was conducted as part of WWE SmackDown between October and December 2004. The prize was announced as a $1,000,000 professional wrestling contract, however, it was in reality a four-year contract at $250,000 a year, with the option to terminate the contract after the first year.

On November 4, 2004, episode of SmackDown!, taped in St. Louis, Missouri, during an unscripted segment of Tough Enough, Kurt Angle, a former American amateur wrestler and 1996 Olympic gold medalist, challenged the finalists through a squat thrust competition. Chris Nawrocki won the competition and the prize of a shoot match against Angle. Angle quickly took Nawrocki down with a guillotine choke, but Nawrocki managed to make it to the ropes, forcing Angle to break the hold. Angle then took Nawrocki down with a double leg takedown, breaking his ribs. Angle locked another guillotine choke on Nawrocki, pinning him in the process. After Angle defeated Nawrocki, Angle challenged the other finalists. Puder accepted Angle's challenge.

Angle and Puder wrestled for position, with Angle taking Puder down. However, in the process, Puder locked Angle in a kimura lock. With Puder on his back and Angle's arm locked in the kimura, Angle attempted a pin, and one of two referees in the ring, Jim Korderas, quickly counted three to end the bout, despite the fact that Puder's shoulders were not fully down on the mat, bridging up at two. Dave Meltzer and Dave Scherer gave these following comments:

On December 12, 2004,  Puder competed in his first WWE pay-per-view event, Armageddon, defeating Mike Mizanin in a Dixie Dog Fight. Puder was announced as the winner on December 14, 2004 (televised on December 16, 2004).

On January 30, 2005, Puder competed in his second WWE pay-per-view event, being entered in the Royal Rumble match. Puder, however, was shortly eliminated after being chopped by Chris Benoit, Hardcore Holly, and Eddie Guerrero. Puder was eliminated by Holly.

Ohio Valley Wrestling (2005)
In January 2005, Puder participated in the WWE's developmental territory, Ohio Valley Wrestling (OVW). In September 2005, Puder was released by WWE as a cost-cutting move. Puder was given the option of signing a development contract with WWE and transferring to its Deep South Wrestling development camp with less pay, but Puder declined the offer. Puder gave this comment;

In September 2007, Yahoo! Sports ran an interview with Puder. In the interview, Puder briefly mentioned his stay in Ohio Valley Wrestling. Puder said:

Kenny Bolin, a manager at OVW, took offense to this. Bolin then sent out the following email to Yahoo!:

Ring of Honor (2007–2008)
In December 2007, Puder signed with Ring of Honor (ROH). On December 29, 2007, at the Manhattan Center, in New York City, Puder made his debut in ROH, at Rising Above, attacking Claudio Castagnoli and aligning himself with Sweet and Sour Inc., led by Larry Sweeney. On December 30, 2007, at Final Battle 2007, Puder helped Sweeney defeat Castagnoli. In January 2008, Puder would appear on two more shows, however, due to budget cuts, Puder was released.

New Japan Pro Wrestling (2010–2011)
On June 19, 2010, Puder made his debut for New Japan Pro Wrestling at Dominion 6.19, losing to former three–time IWGP Heavyweight Champion Shinsuke Nakamura. On October 11, 2010, it was announced that Puder would team with Nakamura in the 2010 G1 Tag League, which would take place over eleven shows in October and November. In their first match in the tournament on October 22, Puder and Nakamura were defeated by Hiroshi Tanahashi and TAJIRI. On October 25 Puder picked up his first victory in New Japan, defeating Tomoaki Honma via submission in a singles match. After two wins and three losses in the group stage of the G1 Tag League, Puder and Nakamura finished fourth in their block and did not advance to the semifinals.

Mixed martial arts
While training at the American Kickboxing Academy, in San Jose, California, Puder sought the tutelage of Javier Mendez, Bob Cook, Frank Shamrock, Brian Johnston and Danny Chaid.

On September 6, 2003, at the X-1 promotion, Puder defeated Jay McCown by unanimous decision. On March 10, 2006, at Strikeforce: Shamrock vs. Gracie, at the HP Pavilion at San Jose, in San Jose, California, Puder made his return to MMA, defeating Jesse Fujarczyk by submission due to a rear naked choke. Three months later on June 9, 2006, at Strikeforce: Revenge, at the HP Pavilion at San Jose, in San Jose, California, Puder defeated Tom Tuggle by submission due to an armbar in only twenty-eight seconds. To end the year, on December 8 at Strikeforce: Triple Threat in San Jose, California, Puder defeated Mike Cook by submission due to a rear naked choke.

On February 18, 2007, at BodogFight Series III in Costa Rica, Puder defeated Michael Alden by knockout in forty-five seconds. Several months later on September 29, 2007, at Strikeforce: Playboy Mansion, at The Playboy Mansion, in Los Angeles, California, Puder defeated Richard Dalton by unanimous decision.

On May 16, 2009, at Call to Arms I, at the Citizens Business Bank Arena, in Ontario, California, Puder defeated Jeff Ford by knockout. On August 15, 2009, at Call to Arms: Called Out Fights in Ontario, California, Puder defeated Mychal Clark by unanimous decision.

Puder was scheduled to compete against Tank Abbott, an American mixed martial arts fighter and former professional wrestler. The bout was scheduled on February 26, 2011, at Knockout Fights: The Beginning, at the Santa Monica Airport, in Santa Monica, California, however, Puder withdrew from the bout due to injury, Puder had suffered a torn meniscus and was unable to compete. Abbott, however, had his own opinion on Puder’s withdraw; according to him, Puder noticed that Abbott had shown up in shape during a pre-fight news conference and subsequently pulled out of the bout, When informed of Abbott's account, Puder simply laughed and asked, "Tank, in shape?"

Puder retired from MMA competition, holding a record of eight wins and zero losses.

Coaching
In 2018, Puder provided mixed martial arts instruction using the private coaching service, CoachUp.

Business career
As a high school student in Monta Vista High School, Puder began his entrepreneurial career by starting several successful businesses.

After leaving professional wrestling, Puder founded and is the CEO of My Life My Power (MLMP), founded in 2010, working with police departments, schools, parents and youth to help strengthen communities and to provide organizations and youth with effective programs to help combat bullying through various avenues such as self esteem, self empowerment and body image.

Puder started Puder Strength Training (PST), a non-profit organization to help local high schools by donating weight training equipment to their strength training programs and to underprivileged teenagers. Puder worked with Toys for Tots, After School All Stars, Stanford Hospital, and San Francisco General Hospital. Puder was the official spokesperson for Cops Care Cancer Foundation. Puder opened his own gym, the Knockouts Hollywood MMA Gym, in Hollywood, California, which specializes in martial arts, self-defense and fitness boot camp.

As of 2018, Puder founded and operates four companies, My Life My Power (MLMP), MLMP Institute, My Life My Brand and MLMPI Preparatory Academy.

Personal life
Puder is a born again Christian. He is a deputy sheriff.

Mixed martial arts record

| Win 
| align=center| 8–0
| Mychal Clark
| Decision (unanimous)
| Call to Arms: Called Out Fights
| 
| align=center| 3
| align=center| 5:00
| Ontario, California, United States
| 
|-
| Win
| align=center| 7–0
| Jeff Ford
| TKO (shoulder injury)
| Call to Arms I
| 
| align=center| 1
| align=center| 1:23
| Ontario, California, United States
|
|-
| Win
| align=center| 6–0
| Richard Dalton
| Decision (unanimous)
| Strikeforce: Playboy Mansion
| 
| align=center| 3
| align=center| 5:00
| Los Angeles, California, United States
| 
|-
| Win
| align=center| 5–0
| Michael Alden
| TKO (head kick and punches)
| BodogFight Series III: Costa Rica Combat
| 
| align=center| 1
| align=center| 0:45
| Costa Rica
| 
|-
| Win
| align=center| 4–0
| Mike Cook
| Submission (rear-naked choke)
| Strikeforce: Triple Threat
| 
| align=center| 2
| align=center| 2:31
| San Jose, California, United States
| 
|-
| Win
| align=center| 3–0
| Tom Tuggle
| Submission (armbar)
| Strikeforce: Revenge
| 
| align=center| 1
| align=center| 0:28
| San Jose, California, United States
| 
|-
| Win
| align=center| 2–0
| Jesse Fujarczyk
| Submission (rear-naked choke)
| Strikeforce: Shamrock vs. Gracie
| 
| align=center| 1
| align=center| 1:54
| San Jose, California, United States
| 
|-
| Win
| align=center| 1–0
| Jay McCown
| Decision (unanimous)
| X-1
| 
| align=center| 3
| align=center| 3:00
| Yokohama, Japan
|

Championships and accomplishments
World Wrestling Entertainment
$1,000,000 Tough Enough (2004)

See also
List of professional wrestlers by MMA record

References

External links

1981 births
American male mixed martial artists
American practitioners of Brazilian jiu-jitsu
American male professional wrestlers
Heavyweight mixed martial artists
Mixed martial artists utilizing wrestling
Mixed martial artists utilizing Brazilian jiu-jitsu
Living people
People from Cupertino, California
Tough Enough winners
Mixed martial artists from California
Professional wrestlers from California